

Family tree

Swedish royalty
Dynasty genealogy